No. 452 Squadron is a Royal Australian Air Force (RAAF) air traffic control unit. It was established in 1941 as a fighter squadron, in accordance with Article XV of the Empire Air Training Scheme during World War II. The squadron flew Supermarine Spitfires for the entire war, initially over the United Kingdom and Nazi-occupied Europe. It was later based in Australia and the Netherlands East Indies, before being disbanded in 1945. It was re-raised in its current role in February 2011.

History
No. 452 Squadron RAAF was formed at RAF Kirton-in-Lindsey on 8 April 1941 under Article XV of the Empire Air Training Scheme; it was the first Australian squadron formed in Britain during World War II. On 22 May, the squadron became operational as a fighter unit, flying early model Supermarine Spitfires. In July, it was moved to RAF Kenley, where it became part of No. 11 Group RAF.

The squadron rapidly developed a formidable reputation in operations against German forces; in one month it was credited with shooting down 22 German Bf 109 fighters. It was involved in many different kinds of operation, including offensive patrols, convoy escort and bomber escort missions over Europe. One of the most unusual occurred on 19 August 1941, when the Kenley Wing—among others—had to escort a formation that included a Blenheim bomber that—with the co-operation of the Germans—dropped an artificial leg by parachute, for British ace Douglas Bader, who was a prisoner of war. The bombers then flew on to bomb the Gosnay power plant. In the dogfighting that took place during the operation, No. 452 Squadron was heavily engaged, shooting down one aircraft and scoring "probable" victories over two others; several of its aircraft were damaged.

Another notable operation was the attack on the German warships Scharnhorst, Prinz Eugen and Gneisenau, which were attempting the Channel Dash from Brest harbour on 11 February 1942, damaging one of the escorting destroyers. One of the squadron's best known pilots during this time was Keith "Bluey" Truscott, who was credited with 16 aerial victories from April 1941 to March 1942 and was awarded the Distinguished Flying Cross (DFC) while serving with No. 452 Squadron in Britain. Although nominally an Australian unit while it was in Europe,  No. 452 Squadron also had some British personnel, members from British Commonwealth countries and other nationalities. One of these was the Irish ace Paddy Finucane. A number of Polish pilots also flew with the squadron.

The squadron moved to RAF Redhill in October 1941, remaining there until March 1942, when No. 452 Squadron replaced its sister, No. 457 Squadron, at RAF Andreas, Isle of Man, where it remained until it withdrew from operations in Britain in June to return to Australia. Its final aerial victory came that month and the squadron's final tally in Europe was 70 enemy aircraft shot down and 17 damaged, for the loss of 22 pilots killed. It sailed for home on 21 June, arriving in Melbourne on 13 August and re-assembled at RAAF Station Richmond, New South Wales on 6 September. The squadron began refresher training at Richmond, using a varied collection of aircraft because its Spitfires had been commandeered in transit by the Royal Air Force in the Middle East.

No. 452 Squadron became operational again on 17 January 1943, having received Spitfire MK Vc aircraft in October the previous year. Based at Batchelor Airfield in the Northern Territory it became part of No. 1 Wing RAAF, which defended Darwin from Japanese air raids. The squadron was relocated to Strauss Airfield on 1 February and apart a brief period between 9 and 27 March 1943 when it was deployed to RAAF Station Pearce to reinforce the air defences of Perth, it remained at Strauss, protecting Darwin, until 30 June 1944. The previous April, the squadron had received more advanced Mark VIII Spitfire.  In May, it had become part of No. 80 Wing RAAF. Throughout this period, the squadron was involved in significant actions during which it shot down several Japanese aircraft; its first big battle took place in early March.

On 1 July 1944 the squadron relocated again, this time to Sattler Airfield in the Northern Territory. Responsibility for defending Darwin had been handed over to two Royal Air Force squadrons; No. 452 Squadron was reassigned to ground-attack missions. The squadron began attacking targets in the Dutch East Indies and on 11 December 1944 it was sent to Morotai, where it was assigned to the 1st Tactical Air Force, to support the Australian operations in Kalimantan, flying mainly ground attack missions and anti-shipping strikes. The ground staff were sent to Juwata airfield on Tarakan in May 1945 but operations had to wait until the landing field was ready. The squadron undertook missions against Kelabaken and Simalumong on 2 July; further attacks occurred on Tawoa on 10 July. A detachment moved to Balikpapan on 15 July and began operations to support Australian troops there. The detachment remained until the end of the war, flying its last sortie on 10 August 1945; its final aerial victory of the war came on 24 July when a Japanese bomber was shot down in a night raid over Balikpapan.

Operations continued after the war, albeit limited to defensive duties only. In October the aircraft of 452 Squadron were returned to Australia and the unit disbanded at Tarakan on 17 November 1945. Australian casualties during the war amounted to 49 killed.

No. 452 Squadron was re-raised as an air traffic control unit on 16 February 2011. It forms part of No. 44 Wing at RAAF Base Darwin. It maintains subordinate flights at the "northern" RAAF bases, RAAF Base Darwin, RAAF Base Tindal, RAAF Base Amberley, RAAF Base Townsville and the Oakey Army Aviation Centre. These flights provide the air traffic control service for these bases.

Aircraft operated
No. 452 Squadron operated the following aircraft:

Squadron bases
No. 452 Squadron operated from the following bases and airfields:

Commanding officers
No. 452 Squadron was commanded by the following officers:

See also
 RAAF units under RAF operational control

References

Notes

Bibliography

External links

 "Out of the Blue" – Thorold-Smith painting by Troy White

452
Australian Article XV squadrons of World War II
Military units and formations established in 1941
Military units in Northern Territory
Military units in Queensland